Healing Hearts is a 2015 Philippine television drama series broadcast by GMA Network. Directed by Roderick Alexis P. Lindayag, it stars Joyce Ching and Kristofer Martin. It premiered on May 11, 2015 on the network's Afternoon Prime line up replacing Kailan Ba Tama ang Mali?. The series concluded on September 11, 2015 with a total of 89 episodes. It was replaced by Destiny Rose in its timeslot.

The series is streaming online on YouTube.

Premise
Rachel seems to have a perfect family until she discovers that her marriage is a scheme for her husband to inherit her wealth. She catches her husband and the mistresses leading to her killing Michael and to her imprisonment. The mistress, Nimfa seeks revenge by stealing Rachel's daughter Mikaela. Eventually, the child grows up under the name of Liza who will eventually fall in love with Nimfa's stepson, Jay.

Cast and characters

Lead cast
 Joyce Ching as Mikaela Liza Saavedra Espanto 
 Kristofer Martin as Jay Mendoza

Supporting cast
 Krystal Reyes as Chloe Samonte
 Ken Chan as Anton
 Angelika dela Cruz as Nimfa Mendoza-Villamor
 Mickey Ferriols as Rachel Saavedra
 Maureen Larrazabal as Kleng Samonte 
 Dominic Roco as Stephen
 Tina Paner as Alice Trajano

Guest cast
 Ronaldo Valdez as Benjie
 Neil Ryan Sese as Michael "Mike" Espanto
 Jay Manalo as Abel Villamor
 Jenny Miller as Emily Fuentes
 Arthur Solinap as Lando
 Mel Kimura as Warden
 Ashley Cabrera as young Chloe
 Rhed Bustamante as young Liza
 Shermaine Santiago as Elsa
 Elle Ramirez as Cecille
 Lucho Ayala as Jimboy
 Nicole Dulalia as Yvette 
 Abel Estanislao as Earl
 Kyle Ocampo as May Trajano
 Robert Seña as Alfred
 Dang Cruz as Ellen
 Jace Flores as Gary
 Dino Guevarra as Fidel
 Kenneth Cruz as Kenjie
 Lotlot Bustamante as Felly
 Scarlet as Ate Baby
 Afi Africa as Randy
 Chingga Riego as Siony
 Steph Yancha as Marlyn
 Annika Camaya as Annie
 Rania Lindayag as Chloe's friend
 Fatima Al-alawi as Chloe's friend
 Gabriel Barriento as Chloe's friend

Ratings
According to AGB Nielsen Philippines' Mega Manila household television ratings, the pilot episode of Healing Hearts earned a 12.7% rating. While the final episode scored a 17.9% rating.

Accolades

References

External links
 
 

2015 Philippine television series debuts
2015 Philippine television series endings
Filipino-language television shows
GMA Network drama series
Television shows set in Quezon City